Katoonarib (short for Katoonaru Iribi) is a village in the Upper Takutu-Upper Essequibo Region of Guyana. Katoonarib is inhabited by Wapishana, Macushi and other Amerindians. It is located near the Rupununi River. The main language spoken in the village is Wapishana with English as secondary language.

Overview
The name of the village translates to Bush Island. Katoonarib used to be a satellite of Sawariwau, but has set up its own traditional government. The economy is based on subsistence farming and cattle ranching. The village has a primary school, a health centre, and a community centre. Internet connection is provided via free Wi-Fi. Water is supplied by wells. There is no electricity other than private diesel generators and solar panels.

Transport
Katoonarib can be reached by road from Lethem. A bridge over the Rupununi River was commissioned in 2004. On 27 May 2008, the bridge collapsed under the weight of an excavator.

References

Indigenous villages in Guyana
Populated places in Upper Takutu-Upper Essequibo